Roadside Monument was an American math rock band from Seattle, Washington, who were active from 1994–1998 and then again from 2002–2003.

History
Before Roadside Monument began, singer Doug Lorig was involved in other bands. During junior high, high school, and college, he performed in the bands Cow Shrapnel, Waterfront, and Sixth Hour, all of which also featured another future Roadside Monument member, bassist Todd Florence.

Roadside Monument signed with Tooth & Nail Records  about four months after they formed in 1994.  They released their Tooth & Nail debut, a 7-inch vinyl EP called My Life Is Green, in 1995. Their full-length album Beside This Brief Hexagonal was also released in 1996. After the rest of the band left, Matt Johnson (of Blenderhead) (drums) and Johnathan Ford (bass) joined the band. Lorig, Ford and Johnson became the band's sole members on all future releases. In 1997, Eight Hours Away from Being a Man was released, along with a pair of split EPs (with Puller and Frodus). Eight Hours Away from Being a Man became a prominent album in the indie rock, emo and Christian underground music scenes.

Roadside Monument broke up after the Cornerstone Festival in 1998, when Ford moved to Chicago, Illinois.  They had already written and recorded another album, called I Am the Day of Current Taste, which was released several months after their breakup.

In 2002, Ford returned to Seattle, and Roadside Monument reunited.  The band played local shows and toured with Pedro the Lion before breaking up again in 2003.

Side projects
Since their breakup, Roadside Monument's members have participated in a variety of bands:
 Suffering and the Hideous Thieves is an experimental band founded by Jeff "Suffering" Bettger of another former Tooth & Nail band, Ninety Pound Wuss.  Bettger writes most of the songs, but Ford and Johnson have also played in the band.
 Lorig was in the final lineup for Raft of Dead Monkeys, another band that Bettger fronted after Ninety Pound Wuss.  Ford and Johnson also played in Raft of Dead Monkeys, a controversial band that broke up in 2001.
 Lorig has since played in the space rock band Black Eagle and currently fronts the grunge band Patrol.
 Ford was a founding member of the "doom hardcore" band Warlord and filled in on bass for them during live shows.  He left Warlord before they recorded their lone full-length album, Rock the Foe Hammer, which came out in 1999. , through Solid State Records.
 Ford filled in on bass for Pedro the Lion from time to time after Roadside Monument's first breakup.
 Ford is the core member of Unwed Sailor.
 Johnson is the drummer for The Out Circuit.

Critical response
Throughout their history, Roadside Monument has had several clashes with some Christian bookstore chains, who cited their songs as being "controversial".  Examples of such songs included "Sperm Ridden Burden" (which Lorig said Ford wrote about seeing a child on a bus who was being raised by a single mother) and "O. J. Simpson House Auction" (the news on television when Lorig was looking for the title to the song he was working on).  The band members did not mind that their music was not being sold in Christian bookstores, because they preferred to think of themselves as a "band" rather than as a "Christian band".  In an interview with HM Magazine soon after their breakup, drummer Matt Johnson said, "... I think the problem comes in when you start using the word 'Christian' as an adjective. And when I start hearing talk like that, my first inclination is to run totally in the opposite direction.... It's just a debate that I've been over and over with people so much, that I'm not even sure what to say anymore. It's like, I'm a Christian and I play music, and if that means my band is a 'Christian band', then whatever."

Many fans of Roadside Monument like the band because of their creative sound.  They are credited as being key contributors to the original emo sub-culture and sound of indie rock which existed in the mid to late nineties.  Their songs featured unique structure that was a blatant rejection of the verse/chorus structure followed by many popular songs.  In addition, their unusual guitar parts, abnormal rhythms, and abrupt tempo changes, topped off by Lorig's emotional vocals, gained them acclaim and made the band's style almost unable to be labeled.  Indeed, reviewers of the band would describe them as emo, math rock, or just regular rock.

Current members
 Doug Lorig: guitar, vocals
 Matt Johnson: drums
 Johnathon Ford: bass guitar, vocals

Founding members 
 Todd Florence - bass guitar
 Mike Dente - guitar, vocals
 Joel Metzger - drums
 Doug Lorig - guitar, vocals

Discography
 My Life is Green (7-inch, 1996, Tooth & Nail Records)
 Beside This Brief Hexagonal (1996, Tooth & Nail Records)
 Roadside Monument/Puller Split EP (1997, Tooth & Nail Records)
 Eight Hours Away from Being a Man (1997, Tooth & Nail Records)
 Roadside Monument / Frodus Split EP (1997, Tooth & Nail Records)
 I Am the Day of Current Taste'' (1998, Tooth & Nail Records)

External links
 Official homepage
 Band members page from official website - gives details about the band members' current musical projects
 SHZine interview with Matt Johnson (April 2002)

Christian rock groups from Washington (state)
Tooth & Nail Records artists
Musical groups from Seattle
Musical groups established in 1994